Electoral district no. 9 is one of the 12 multi-member electoral districts of the Riigikogu, the national legislature of Estonia. The district was established as electoral district no. 8 in 1995 following the re-organisation of electoral districts. It was renamed electoral district no. 9 in 2003 following another re-organisation of electoral districts. It is conterminous with the counties of Jõgeva and Tartu (excluding Tartu municipality which has its own electoral district). The district currently elects seven of the 101 members of the Riigikogu using the open party-list proportional representation electoral system. At the 2019 parliamentary election it had 65,898 registered electors.

Electoral system
Electoral district no. 9 currently elects seven of the 101 members of the Riigikogu using the open party-list proportional representation electoral system. The allocation of seats is carried out in three stages. In the first stage, any individual candidate, regardless of whether they are a party or independent candidate, who receives more votes than the district's simple quota (Hare quota: valid votes in district/number of seats allocated to district) is elected via a personal mandate. In the second stage, district mandates are allocated to parties by dividing their district votes by the district's simple quota. Only parties that reach the 5% national threshold compete for district mandates and any personal mandates won by the party are subtracted from the party's district mandates. Prior to 2003 if a party's surplus/remainder votes was equal to or greater than 75% of the district's simple quota it received one additional district mandate. Any unallocated district seats are added to a national pool of compensatory seats. In the final stage, compensatory mandates are calculated based on the national vote and using a modified D'Hondt method. Only parties that reach the 5% national threshold compete for compensatory seats and any personal and district mandates won by the party are subtracted from the party's compensatory mandates. Though calculated nationally, compensatory mandates are allocated at the district level.

Seats
Seats allocated to electoral district no. 9 by the National Electoral Committee of Estonia at each election was as follows:
 2023 - 7
 2019 - 7
 2015 - 8
 2011 - 7
 2007 - 7
 2003 - 8
 1999 - 8
 1995 - 8

Election results

Summary

(Excludes compensatory seats)

Detailed

2023
Results of the 2023 parliamentary election held on 5 March 2023:

The following candidates were elected:
 District mandates - Kert Kingo (EKRE), 3,095 votes; Aivar Kokk (IE), 3,136 votes; Urmas Kruuse (REF), 6,235 votes; Irja Lutsar (EE200), 3,523 votes; Luisa Rõivas (REF), 2,939 votes; 
 Compensatory mandates -  Erkki Keldo (REF), 1,445 votes;

2019
Results of the 2019 parliamentary election held on 3 March 2019:

The following candidates were elected:
 District mandates - Peeter Ernits (EKRE), 3,846 votes; Urmas Kruuse (RE), 5,398 votes; Valdo Randpere (RE), 2,079 votes; Raivo Tamm (I), 2,583 votes; and Marika Tuus-Laul (K), 2,095 votes.
 Compensatory mandates - Kert Kingo (EKRE), 1,082 votes; and Aivar Kokk (I), 2,536 votes.

2015
Results of the 2015 parliamentary election held on 1 March 2015:

The following candidates were elected:
 Personal mandates - Urmas Kruuse (RE), 5,960 votes.
 District mandates - Igor Gräzin (RE), 1,973 votes; Aivar Kokk (IRL), 1,725 votes; Tanel Talve (SDE), 2,294 votes; and Marika Tuus-Laul (K), 2,904 votes.
 Compensatory mandates - Jaak Aaviksoo (IRL), 1,405 votes; Raivo Põldaru (EKRE), 919 votes; and Terje Trei (RE), 557 votes.

2011
Results of the 2011 parliamentary election held on 6 March 2011:

The following candidates were elected:
 Personal mandates - Igor Gräzin (RE), 6,109 votes.
 District mandates - Ene Ergma (IRL), 3,873 votes; Aivar Kokk (IRL), 3,382 votes; Jaan Õunapuu (SDE), 3,103 votes; Mati Raidma (RE), 1,699 votes; and Marika Tuus (K), 2,976 votes.

2007
Results of the 2007 parliamentary election held on 4 March 2007:

The following candidates were elected:
 District mandates - Ene Ergma (IRL), 3,979 votes; Igor Gräzin (RE), 3,001 votes; Villu Reiljan (ERL), 2,855 votes; and Marika Tuus (K), 3,758 votes.
 Compensatory mandates - Mai Treial (ERL), 922 votes.

2003
Results of the 2003 parliamentary election held on 2 March 2003:

The following candidates were elected:
 Personal mandates - Villu Reiljan (ERL), 5,329 votes.
 District mandates - Margi Ein (ERL), 1,881 votes; Tarmo Leinatamm (ÜVE-RP), 3,670 votes; Jaan Õunapuu (ERL), 4,208 votes; Toomas Tein (RE), 1,867 votes; and Marika Tuus (K), 4,028 votes.
 Compensatory mandates - Mailis Rand (K), 925 votes; and Mai Treial (ERL), 1,704 votes.

1999
Results of the 1999 parliamentary election held on 7 March 1999:

The following candidates were elected:
 Personal mandates - Villu Reiljan (EME), 5,252 votes.
 District mandates - Erika Salumäe (K), 2,577 votes; and Enn Tarto (M), 1,738 votes.
 Compensatory mandates - Liia Hänni (M), 804 votes; Kalle Jürgenson (I), 1,633 votes; Kaljo Kiisk (RE), 2,051 votes; Peeter Olesk (I), 1,489 votes; Jaan Pöör (EME), 376 votes; and Mai Treial (KE), 1,593 votes.

1995
Results of the 1995 parliamentary election held on 5 March 1995:

The following candidates were elected:
 Personal mandates - Villu Reiljan (KMÜ), 6,800 votes.
 District mandates - Aavo Mölder (KMÜ), 2,557 votes; and Juhan Telgmaa (KMÜ), 3,783 votes.
 Compensatory mandates - Ignar Fjuk (RE), 2,618 votes; Liia Hänni (M), 662 votes; Nikolai Maspanov (MKOE), 1,236 votes; Ülo Nugis (P), 2,940 votes; Jaan Pöör (KMÜ), 1,022 votes;  and Mai Treial (KMÜ), 1,021 votes.

References

Riigikogu electoral district
09
09
Riigikogu electoral district, 9